Ernest Pogorelc (1838–1892) was the first professional photographer from Ljubljana and of Slovene and Gottschee German descent from the Lower Carniola Region, now recognized as parts of Slovenia. He was born in Dolenja Vas, Ribnica. He was a prolific studio photographer during the 19th century. His work appears in the trade registry in 1859. Expanding in 1864, he acquired an additional studio maintaining one on Vienna Street and one on Railway Station Street Ljubljana. In 1887, relocated to Zagreb continuing his work there. He died in Ljubljana.

External links

  Ateljejski fotografi na Slovenskem (1859–1919) [Studio Photographers in the Slovene Lands]. Eiselt, Irena. Šolar, Renata. Grgantov, Meta. Published by: National and University Library of Slovenia. March 2006. Accessed: 16 February 2012.

1838 births
1892 deaths
Carniolan photographers
Artists from Ljubljana
Pioneers of photography